Amar Hecini (born 18 November 1971) is a retired sprinter who specialised in the 400 metres. He represented his country at the 1996 Summer Olympics as well as at four outdoor and one indoor World Championships.

International competitions

1Did not finish in the final

Personal bests
Outdoor
200 metres – 20.96 (+0.4 m/s, Narbonne 1994)
400 metres – 45.90 (Udine 1991)
800 metres – 1:44.84 (Rieti 1996)
Indoor
400 metres – 47.95 (Seville 1991)

References

External links
 

1971 births
Living people
Athletes (track and field) at the 1996 Summer Olympics
Algerian male sprinters
Olympic athletes of Algeria
Place of birth missing (living people)
Athletes (track and field) at the 1991 Mediterranean Games
Athletes (track and field) at the 1993 Mediterranean Games
Mediterranean Games competitors for Algeria
21st-century Algerian people
20th-century Algerian people